Elai Kaatha Amman temple is a temple situated in the Madurai district of Tamil Nadu, India. This temple is exactly located in a place called "Kovil Patti", within the Panchayat limit of Kurichipatti. Kovil patti is approximately 14 km from Melur. Elai Kaatha Amman Temple comes under the place called Vellalur, people call this place as Vellalur Nadu (Nadu means - own country).

        Elai kaatha amman temple and Valladikaarar temple are two important temples for these people. Lord Valladikaarar and Goddess Elai katha amman are brother and sister. The festival for Elai katha amman take place in the month of September and for Valladikarar swami take place in the month of March.  During the festival time of both the temples people fast for 15 days without eating non-veg foods and flour involved food (Like : Idly,Dosa,Vada,Chappathi,Poori etc.). They will not break or cut the coconut,lemon,trees and construction works won't take place.(No mixing of cement or mud)  and even the hotels won't be running, they celebrate this festival with joy more than any other festivals like Diwali or Pongal.

       Seven young girls of about 10 years of age around more than 65 villages which comes under Vellalore Nadu are selected as Daughters 
of the above-mentioned Amman and they respect girls as Goddess as well as they will do holy service for entire 15 days. These seven girls are selected by Ealai Kaatha Amman Temple priest (Poosaari - Melavalasai).

Hindu temples in Madurai district